In enzymology, an UDP-N-acetylgalactosamine-4-sulfate sulfotransferase is an enzyme that catalyzes the chemical reaction

3'-phosphoadenylyl sulfate + UDP-N-acetyl-D-galactosamine 4-sulfate  adenosine 3',5'-bisphosphate + UDP-N-acetyl-D-galactosamine 4,6-bissulfate

Thus, the two substrates of this enzyme are 3'-phosphoadenylyl sulfate and UDP-N-acetyl-D-galactosamine 4-sulfate, whereas its two products are adenosine 3',5'-bisphosphate and UDP-N-acetyl-D-galactosamine 4,6-bissulfate.

This enzyme belongs to the family of transferases, specifically the sulfotransferases, which transfer sulfur-containing groups.  The systematic name of this enzyme class is 3'-phosphoadenylyl-sulfate:UDP-N-acetyl-D-galactosamine-4-sulfate 6-sulfotransferase. Other names in common use include uridine diphosphoacetylgalactosamine 4-sulfate sulfotransferase, uridine diphospho-N-acetylgalactosamine 4-sulfate sulfotransferase, and uridine diphosphoacetylgalactosamine 4-sulfate sulfotransferase.

References

 

EC 2.8.2
Enzymes of unknown structure